Hetaerina titia, the smoky rubyspot, is a species of broad-winged damselfly in the family Calopterygidae. It is found in Central America and North America.

The IUCN conservation status of Hetaerina titia is "LC", least concern, with no immediate threat to the species' survival. The population is stable. The IUCN status was reviewed in 2018.

References

Further reading

External links

 

Calopterygidae
Articles created by Qbugbot
Insects described in 1773
Taxa named by Dru Drury